A skipped beat is a heart arrhythmia or palpitation:

Supraventricular extrasystole

Skipped beat may also refer to:

 Premature ventricular contraction
 Premature atrial contraction
 Cardiac dysrhythmia

See also 
 
 "Skipping a Beat" (song), a 2013 single by Jordin Sparks off her 2015 album Right Here, Right Now
 Skip Beat!, a Japanese shoujo manga comic book
 Skip Beat! (Taiwanese TV series), a live action TV show based on the Japanese shoujo comics
 Heart Skips a Beat (disambiguation)